This is a list of companies (equities and funds) on the NZX, the national stock exchange main board.

Former constituents

References

External links
 All securities, NZX

New Zealand Exchange